The Carrathool Shire is a local government area that borders both the Riverina and Far West regions of New South Wales, Australia. The Shire comprises  and is located adjacent to the Mid-Western Highway and north of the Sturt Highway.

The largest town in the Shire is Hillston and the council seat is Goolgowi.  The Shire also includes the villages of Merriwagga, Rankins Springs and Carrathool.

Where once regular droughts made life almost untenable, the area now has irrigated crops, gardens, greened sporting facilities and village verges. Most of the change was made possible by the widespread use of river and underground water.

Demographics

History
In May 1934 Carrathool Shire Council voted to remove the shire offices from Carrathool to Goolgowi.  The decision was made because Carrathool township was located at the south-west corner of the large shire, whereas Goolgowi was in a more central position.

Council

Current composition and election method
Carrathool Shire Council is composed of ten councillors elected proportionally as two separate wards, each electing five councillors. All councillors are elected for a fixed four-year term of office. The mayor is elected by the councillors at the first meeting of the council. The most recent election was held on 4 December 2021. The makeup of the council is as follows:

The current Council, elected in 2021, in order of election by ward, is:

References 

 
Local government areas of the Riverina
Local government areas of New South Wales
Far West (New South Wales)